Enver Murad  (1913–1999, Karachi) was a former Pakistani diplomat who served as ambassador to a number of countries including Austria, Ceylon and Zaire.

Early life and family
Murad married Jamila, the daughter of Khalifa Mohammad Asadullah, in 1943 and had four children.

Career
He studied at the Aligarh Muslim University, was an all round sportsman and keen golfer, and represented his University in Cricket and Swimming. 
1940 he joined the Royal Indian Navy. 
In 1947 his services were transferred to the Pakistan Navy, where he held various staff appointments and attained the rank of Commander before joining the Foreign Service of Pakistan. 
He served in the Ministry of Foreign Affairs and Pakistan missions in Moscow as Second Secretary and London.

In 1959 he was Minister Chargé d'affaires of the Embassy next to Mohammed V of Morocco in Rabat, Morocco.

Ceylon
In 1963 Murad was appointed High Commissioner to Colombo, Sri Lanka and was also concurrently accredited as Ambassador to Malé, Maldives.
He represented Pakistan in the Colombo Plan (Organisation for regional cooperation) from 1963 to 1967.

Austria
In 1967 he was appointed Ambassador in Vienna, with concurrent accreditation to Budapest, Hungary, during his stay in Vienna, he represented Pakistan at the International Atomic Energy Agency from 1967 to 1971, and Alternative Governor for Pakistan on its Board of Governors from 1969 to 1971.

During his ambassadorship in Austria, Murad was part of the Board to manage the new Islamic Centre in Vienna which however, was not constructed until the 1970s due to a lack of funds.

Turkey
In 1972 he was appointed Ambassador to Ankara.

Zaire
In 1976 he was appointed Ambassador to Mobutu Sese Seko in Kinshasa.

References

1913 births
1999 deaths
Muhajir people
Ambassadors of Pakistan to Austria
High Commissioners of Pakistan to Sri Lanka
Ambassadors of Pakistan to the Soviet Union
Ambassadors of Pakistan to the Democratic Republic of the Congo
Ambassadors of Pakistan to Morocco
High Commissioners of Pakistan to the Maldives
Ambassadors of Pakistan to Hungary
Ambassadors of Pakistan to Turkey
Pakistan Navy officers